Přimda is a town in Tachov District the Plzeň Region of the Czech Republic. It has about 1,500 inhabitants.

Administrative parts
Villages of Kundratice, Malé Dvorce, Málkov, Mlýnec, Rájov, Třískolupy, Újezd pod Přimdou and Velké Dvorce are administrative parts of Přimda.

Geography
It lies in the Upper Palatinate Forest.

History

The first written mention of the Přimda Castle is from 1121, when it was an important border fortress. The first written mention of the settlement Přimda is in a deed of King John of Bohemia from 1331, when it was already referred to as a town.

Transport
The D5 motorway passes through the northern part of the municipal territory.

Sights
The town is known for the Romanesque Přimda Castle, a ruin of the second oldest castle in the country (after Prague Castle). It is located on the Přimda hill. A massive prismatic tower from the first half of the 12th century has been preserved.

Climate

Twin towns – sister cities

Přimda is twinned with:
 Pfreimd, Germany

References

External links

Cities and towns in the Czech Republic
Populated places in Tachov District